The MTV Video Music Award for Best Visual Effects is a craft award given to the artist, the artist's manager, and the visual effects artists and/or visual effects company of the music video. From 1984 to 2006, the award's full name was Best Special Effects in a Video, and after a brief removal in 2007, its name was shortened to Best Special Effects between 2008 and 2011. In 2012, the category acquired its current name.

The biggest winners are director Jim Blashfield, special effects artist Sean Broughton, executive producer Loris Paillier and production company GloriaFX, with two wins each. In terms of nominations, visual effects company Mathematic is the biggest nominee in the category's history (seven nominations).  Closely following are GloriaFX and Ingenuity Studios (formerly Ingenuity Engine), each receiving a total of six nominations. Special effects supervisors David Yardley and Fred Raimondi, as well as the companies Pixel Envy (headed by the Brothers Strause) and BUF come in third place, with four nominations apiece.

The performer whose videos have won the most awards is Peter Gabriel, garnering three Moonmen. Meanwhile, Missy Elliott's videos have received the most nominations with six.

No performer has won a Moonman in this category for working on their video's effects. However, David Byrne from Talking Heads ("Burning Down the House") and Adam Jones from Tool ("Prison Sex") have been nominated for doing such work.

Recipients

References

MTV Video Music Awards
Awards established in 1984